The Volkshaus is a 1,200-seat concert hall located in Zürich, Switzerland. The building construction began in June 1909 and publicly opened the following year.

References

External links

 

Music venues in Switzerland
Music venues completed in 1910
Art Nouveau architecture in Switzerland
Art Nouveau theatres
Tourist attractions in Zürich
Cultural venues in Zürich
20th-century architecture in Switzerland